Voorhees College is a college in Vellore, Tamil Nadu, India.  It was founded in 1898 as Arcot Mission College, when Arcot Mission High School was amalgamated to the University of Madras.  The college is named after its benefactors, Mr. and Mrs.  Ralph and Elizabeth Voorhees of the Reformed Church in America.  The College was earlier known as Ralph and Elizabeth Voorhees college when it was a Co-educational institution.  In the late sixties towards the end of the tenure of Dr. A.N. Gopal, the then principal, the college stopped admitting women students and dropped the names Ralph and Elizabeth and became known as Voorhees College.  The college began offering master's level courses in 1975.  The College is managed by the Church of South India, Diocese of Vellore. The Chairman of the College is the Bishop of Vellore, and the motto is "In vain without God."

The college is affiliated to Thiruvalluvar University, Vellore and it is accredited by the National Assessment and Accreditation Council, with an A grade (2005).

Alumni

Sarvepalli Radhakrishnan – The former President of India
M.C.Raja
First dalit MP and MLA in India. also Professor of in this college

Courses
The following courses are offered:

Undergraduate courses
 B.A. Defence and Strategic Studies
 B.A. English
 B.A. History
 B.A. Tamil
 B.Sc. Chemistry
 B.Sc. Computer Science
 B.Sc. Mathematics
 B.Sc. Physics
 B.Sc. Zoology
 B.Sc. Botany
 B.B.A. (Business Administration)
 B.Com. (Aided)
 B.Com. (self-financing)
 B.C.A (Computer Applications)
 B.A. Economics

Postgraduate courses
 M.A. Defence & Strategic Studies
 M.A. History 
 M.A. Tamil (self-financing)
 M.A. English (Self-financing)
 M.A. Economics (Self-financing)
 M.Com. 
 M.Sc. Chemistry (self-financing)
 M.Sc. Mathematics
 M.Sc. Physics (self-financing)
 M.Sc. Zoology

Research
 M.Phil. Tamil
 M.Phil. History
 M.Phil. Commerce
 M.Phil. Zoology
 M.Phil. Physics
 M.Phil. Chemistry
 M.Phil. Mathematics
 Ph.D. in Commerce
 Ph.D. in History
 Ph.D. in Tamil
 Ph.D. in Zoology

References

External links
 NAAC accreditation report
 Voorhees College to seek autonomy, The Hindu, 17 Dec 2004
 Official website

Universities and colleges affiliated with the Church of South India
Universities and colleges in Vellore district
Reformed Church in America
Education in Vellore
Educational institutions established in 1898
1898 establishments in India
Colleges affiliated to Thiruvalluvar University
Academic institutions formerly affiliated with the University of Madras